"Natural High" is a song performed by Bloodstone, released as the first single and title track from their second album. The song was written by the band's bassist Charles McCormick, and it was the first song from the band to enter the Billboard Hot 100, peaking at number 10 on 21 July 1973.

The song also reached number 40 on the UK Singles chart, and was featured on the soundtrack of Quentin Tarantino's Blaxploitation crime drama Jackie Brown (1997).

Chart positions

Weekly charts

Year-end charts

After 7 version

In 1992, R&B group After 7 covered the song in a medley alongside the Originals' "Baby, I'm for Real". Released as "Baby, I'm for Real/Natural High", the song peaked at number 55 on the Billboard Hot 100.

Chart positions

Weekly charts

Year-end charts

References

1973 singles
1992 singles
After 7 songs
Bloodstone (band) songs
London Records singles
Song recordings produced by Daryl Simmons
Song recordings produced by Mike Vernon (record producer)
Virgin Records singles
1973 songs
1972 songs